James C. Swanson (born April 4, 1934) was an American educator and politician.

Swanson was born in Minneapolis, Minnesota and graduated from Minnehaha Academy. He went to Dunwoody Technical Institute (now Dunwoody College of Technology). Swanson also graduated from University of Minnesota with an industrial arts education degree. He lived in Richfield, Minnesota and was an instructor at the Hennepin Technical Center. Swanson served in the Minnesota House of Representatives from 1969 to 1984 and was a Democrat.

References

1934 births
Living people
Politicians from Minneapolis
People from Richfield, Minnesota
Educators from Minnesota
University of Minnesota alumni
Democratic Party members of the Minnesota House of Representatives